Mnichovice is a town in Prague-East District in the Central Bohemian Region of the Czech Republic. It has about 4,000 inhabitants.

Administrative parts
Villages of Božkov and Myšlín are administrative parts of Mnichovice.

Geography
It lies in the Benešov Uplands. The Mnichovka Stream flows through the town.

History
The first written mention of Mnichovice is from 1134. The village was founded by monks from the Sázava Monastery, who founded here a Romanesque basilica in 1140. In 1420, Mnichovice became a market town. After the monastery was conquered by the Hussites in 1421, the market town became their property, then it was acquired by the Kostka of Postupice family in 1422. Mnichovice was badly damaged by fires in 1531 and 1631, and it was also devastated during the Thirty Years' War in 1638. Further fires damaged the market town in 1746, 1751 and 1865–1872.

From 1852 to 1945, Mnichovice had the title of a town. Its town status was restored in 2000.

Demographics

Transport
The D1 motorway passes along the western municipal border just outside the municipal territory.

Sights
The landmark of Mnichovice is the Church of the Nativity of the Virgin Mary. The original Romanesque church was rebult in the Gothic style around 1330, then it was rebuilt in the Baroque style in 1746–1754.

References

External links

Cities and towns in the Czech Republic
Populated places in Prague-East District